Total Normal is a German television series.

See also
List of German television series

External links
 

Radio Bremen
German comedy television series
1989 German television series debuts
1991 German television series endings
German-language television shows
Das Erste original programming